The Men's 100m T36 had its Final held on September 9 at 10:15.

Medalists

Results

References
Final

Athletics at the 2008 Summer Paralympics